The 1923–24 Indiana State Sycamores men's basketball team represented Indiana State University during the 1923–24 NCAA men's basketball season. The head coach was Arthur Strum, coaching the Sycamores in his first season. The team played their home games at William H. Wiley High School Gymnasium in Terre Haute, Indiana.

Schedule

|-

References

Indiana State Sycamores men's basketball seasons
Indiana State
Indiana State
Indiana State